The 2015 Canberra Tennis International was a professional tennis tournament played on outdoor hard courts. It was the first edition of the tournament which was part of the 2015 ATP Challenger Tour and the 2015 ITF Women's Circuit. It took place in Canberra, Australia between 1 and 8 November 2015.

Men's singles main draw entrants

Seeds

 1Rankings are as of 19 October 2015.

Other entrants
The following players received wildcards into the singles main draw:
  Jacob Grills
  Harry Bourchier
  Christopher O'Connell
  Bradley Mousley

The following players received entry into the singles main draw with a protected ranking:
  Greg Jones

The following players received entry from the qualifying draw:
  Blake Mott
  Oliver Anderson
  Sebastian Fanselow
  Jake Delaney

The following players received entry as a lucky loser:
  Daniel Hobart

Women's singles main draw entrants

Seeds

 1Rankings are as of 26 October 2015.

Other entrants
The following players received wildcards into the singles main draw:
  Maddison Inglis
  Tammi Patterson
  Olivia Tjandramulia

The following players received entry from the qualifying draw:
  Destanee Aiava
  Veronica Corning
  Jennifer Elie
  Jessica Wacnik

The following player received entry by a lucky loser spot:
  Yuki Chiang

The following player received entry by a protected ranking:
  Ilona Kremen

Champions

Men's singles

  Benjamin Mitchell def.  Luke Saville 5–7, 6–0, 6–1

Women's singles

  Asia Muhammad def.  Eri Hozumi, 6–4, 6–3

Men's doubles

  Alex Bolt /  Andrew Whittington def.  Brydan Klein /  Dane Propoggia 7–6(7–2), 6–3

Women's doubles

  Misa Eguchi /  Eri Hozumi def.  Lauren Embree /  Asia Muhammad, 7–6(15–13), 1–6, [14–12]

External links
 Official website
 ATP Challenger Tour official site
 Canberra Tennis International at ITFtennis.com

2015 ITF Women's Circuit
2015 ATP Challenger Tour
2015
2015
2015 in Australian tennis